AirTanker Services, operating as AirTanker, is a British aircraft leasing company providing a fleet of Airbus A330 MRTT tanker/transports, known by the service name "Voyager", to the Royal Air Force for the aerial refuelling role. For additional revenue it operates air charter flights using reserve aircraft. It is a consortium of Airbus, Rolls-Royce plc, Cobham plc, Babcock International and Thales Group.

History
In 2008 the Ministry of Defence signed the Future Strategic Tanker Aircraft (FSTA) contract with AirTanker to provide the Royal Air Force (RAF) with an air transport and air-to-air refuelling capability. As well as supporting the RAF, AirTanker holds a United Kingdom Civil Aviation Authority Type A Operating Licence, permitting it to carry passengers, cargo and mail on aircraft with 20 or more seats.

Following the granting of an air operating licence the airline flew its first charter flight to RAF Akrotiri in Cyprus for the UK Ministry of Defence in January 2013. After delays in certification, its first operational refuelling flight took place on 20 May 2013.

From May 2015, AirTanker leased one aircraft to Thomas Cook Airlines to be deployed on holiday routes. The contract ran for three years, and involved mainly long haul flights from Glasgow, Manchester and London Stansted Airport. The first commercial flight took place on 1 May 2015 from Manchester to Cancun and Punta Cana.

On 30 September 2016, AirTanker reached the final establishment phase milestone in the Future Strategic Tanker Aircraft (FSTA) programme with the achievement of Full Service Date on time and on budget delivering all 14 aircraft.

AirTanker also provides twice-weekly scheduled passenger flights between RAF Brize Norton and RAF Mount Pleasant on the Falkland Islands mainly for military personnel, though fare-paying passengers are also allowed to travel. These flights formerly refuelled at Ascension Island but due to the condition of the runway there, the refuelling stop is now at Cape Verde. During the COVID pandemic, this was moved to Dakar. However, in June 2020 G-VYGM set a record by flying direct from Brize Norton to Mount Pleasant without refuelling.

Fleet

AirTanker has a 27-year contract to provide fourteen aircraft: "core" fleet of nine aircraft – eight with military serials and one civilian registration – and a "surge" fleet of five civil registered aircraft which it uses for additional revenue.

References

External links

Airlines of the United Kingdom
Airlines established in 2012
Airbus joint ventures